Mezhove is an urban-type settlement in Makiivka Municipality (district) in Donetsk Oblast of eastern Ukraine. Population:

Demographics
Native language as of the Ukrainian Census of 2001:
 Ukrainian 15.67%
 Russian 83.87%
 Belarusian 0.15%
 Armenian 0.08%

References

Urban-type settlements in Donetsk Raion